Ambergris is a solid, waxy, flammable substance of a dull grey or blackish colour produced in the digestive system of sperm whales.

Ambergris may also refer to:
 "Ambergris" (Bob's Burgers), an episode of the television series Bob's Burgers
 Ambergris Cay, an island within the Turks and Caicos Islands
 Ambergris Caye, an island in Belize
 Ambergris Glacier, in Antarctica
 Ambergris Stadium, in San Pedro Town, Belize
 "The Ambergris Element", an episode of the television series Star Trek: The Animated Series
 City of Saints and Madmen: The Book of Ambergris, short story collection by Jeff VanderMeer
 "Ambergris", a song by King Gizzard & the Lizard Wizard from their 2022 album Omnium Gatherum